A Missionary (French: Un missionnaire) is a 1955 French drama film directed by Maurice Cloche and starring Yves Massard, Marie-France Planeze and René Blancard. It was shot in Guinea and Cameroon. The film is in Eastmancolor.

Cast
 Yves Massard as Père Jean Maurel  
 Marie-France Planèze as Geneviève  
 René Blancard as Rouhaut  
 Albert Préjean as Brother Timothée  
 Jacques Berthier as Père Duval 
 Charles Vanel as Père Gauthier 
 Habib Benglia 
 Anthony Carretier 
 Claude Cerval 
 Jean Lanier 
 Darling Légitimus 
 Roger Monteaux 
 Johnny Rieu 
 Roger Saget

References

Bibliography 
 Crisp, Colin. French Cinema—A Critical Filmography: Volume 2, 1940–1958. Indiana University Press, 2015.

External links 
 

1955 films
French drama films
1955 drama films
1950s French-language films
Films directed by Maurice Cloche
Films scored by Michel Michelet
1950s French films